The String Quartet No. 3 in D major, Op. 18, No. 3, was written by Ludwig van Beethoven between 1798 and 1800 and published in 1801, dedicated to Joseph Franz von Lobkowitz. Although it is numbered third, it was the first quartet Beethoven composed.

Analysis 
It consists of four movements:

 Allegro (D major)
 Andante con moto (B-flat major)
 Allegro (D major)
 Presto (D major)

According to Steinberg, this is "the gentlest, most consistently lyrical work [within Beethoven's Op. 18]", except for the fourth movement, in which "Beethoven first explores the idea of shifting the centre of gravity toward the end of a multimovement work".

The first movement starts with a gentle and unassuming theme:

However, its return at the start of the recapitulation shows the theme in an entirely different light. Philip Radcliffe (1965, p. 24) describes this moment as “beautifully contrived”. Burstein (1998, p. 295) describes the dramatic and unusual harmonic progression at the end of the development section as “breathtaking”. “The sudden reinterpretation of the C creates a type of tonal crisis which has deep structural ramifications for the entire movement.  Beethoven’s brilliant manner of dealing with the implications of this unusual strategy indicates a debt to his teacher, Haydn, and also reveals much about Beethoven’s own craft and artistic vision”. The final movement contains a theme that resembles the Mexican Hat Dance.

Notes

References
; especially the essay by Michael Steinberg (pp. 159–163)

External links

Performance of String Quartet no. 3 by the Borromeo String Quartet from the Isabella Stewart Gardner Museum in MP3 format

String quartet 03
1800 compositions
Compositions in D major